Kullamaa was a rural municipality of Estonia, in Lääne County. It had a population of 1398 (2006) and an area of 224.6 km².

Populated places
Kullamaa Parish had 14 villages:
Jõgisoo, Kalju, Kastja, Koluvere, Kullamaa, Kullametsa, Leila, Lemmikküla, Liivi, Mõrdu, Päri, Silla, Ubasalu, Üdruma.

References

Some of the content of this article comes from the Estonian Wikipedia article Kullamaa vald.

External links
Official website 

Former municipalities of Estonia